Bewl Water is a reservoir in the valley of the River Bewl, straddling the boundary between Kent and East Sussex in England. The reservoir was part of a project to increase supplies of water in the area. 
It supplies Southern Water’s customers in the Medway towns, Thanet and Hastings. 

Work began to construct the reservoir in 1973 by damming and then flooding a valley. It was completed in 1975 having been filled with over 31,300 million litres of water. The project cost £11 million to build. It is now the largest body of inland water in South East England.

In winter, when the flow in the River Medway exceeds 275 million litres per day, river water is pumped to storage in the reservoir. There is an outline plan to raise the water level by a further 3m to increase the yield by up to 30% to help with the growing water demand in South East England. This will however put further demands on the River Medway to supply the additional water required with the potential for environmental degradation in the river and the eco-systems that it supports.

Leisure use
Bewl Water Outdoor Centre offers a wide range of training, team building and adventure opportunities, on and around the reservoir. These include sailing and windsurfing (formerly through 
Bewl Valley Sailing Club, now through Bewl Sailing Association Ltd), rowing and sculling (through Bewl Bridge Rowing Club), Canoeing, Kayaking and Pedalo hire (through Bewl Canoe Club), and trout & predator fishing. Paddle Boarding is also available. Recent years has seen the introduction of the Bewl Water Aqua Park, a floating obstacle course on the reservoir. 

Away from the water, there are many walking and cycling routes around the 12 mile Round Reservoir Route. Laser Challenge and camping packages can be booked, both with traditional camping pitches or more glamorous Mongolian Yurts available.

There is also a waterfront cafe and conference facility that is available for venue hire, including weddings.

References

External links
Bewl Canoe Club
Bewl Canoe Club Facebook page
Bewl Sailing Association
Bewl Bridge Rowing Club
Bewl Water Reservoir water level

Tourist attractions in Kent
Drinking water reservoirs in England
Buildings and structures in the Borough of Tunbridge Wells
Parks and open spaces in Kent
Country parks in Kent
Sport in Royal Tunbridge Wells
Reservoirs in Kent
Ticehurst